North Bedfordshire was a county constituency in Bedfordshire. It returned one Member of Parliament (MP) to the House of Commons of the Parliament of the United Kingdom, elected by the first-past-the-post voting system.

The constituency was created for the 1983 general election, and abolished for the 1997 general election.

History
This safe Conservative seat was held for its entire existence by Trevor Skeet who had been the MP for Bedford since 1970.

Boundaries
The Borough of North Bedfordshire wards of Brickhill, Bromham, Carlton, Castle, Cauldwell, Clapham, De Parys, Felmersham, Goldington, Harpur, Harrold, Kingsbrook, Newnham, Oakley, Putnoe, Queens Park, Renhold, Riseley, Roxton, and Sharnbrook.

The territory the seat covered was virtually the same as the county constituency of Bedford which it replaced. This included the town of Bedford itself. In 1997, the constituency was abolished, being dispersed on a roughly seven to three ratio between the new constituencies of Bedford and Bedfordshire North East, with 17 electors being transferred to Huntingdon.

Members of Parliament

Elections

Elections in the 1980s

Election in the 1990s

See also
List of parliamentary constituencies in Bedfordshire

Notes and references

Parliamentary constituencies in Bedfordshire (historic)
Constituencies of the Parliament of the United Kingdom established in 1983
Constituencies of the Parliament of the United Kingdom disestablished in 1997
Politics of the Borough of Bedford